The Henry Ahrens House is a historic house located at 212 East University Avenue in Champaign, Illinois. The house was built in 1893 for local businessman Henry Ahrens; it still remains in his family. Architect Seely Brown, who ran a well-regarded practice in Champaign, designed the Queen Anne house. The -story house has an asymmetrical plan with a multi-component roof that includes both hipped and gabled sections. The gable ends are decorated with patterned wooden shingles, which are also used on a porch gable and the hood of a three-sided bay window. The wraparound front porch is supported by turned columns; brackets with scalloped and half-circle decorations adorn the tops of the columns.

The house was added to the National Register of Historic Places on November 22, 2011.

References

Houses on the National Register of Historic Places in Illinois
Queen Anne architecture in Illinois
Houses completed in 1893
National Register of Historic Places in Champaign County, Illinois
Buildings and structures in Champaign, Illinois
Houses in Champaign County, Illinois